Agnolo may refer to:

 Gabriele Agnolo, an Italian architect
 Agnolo (given name),  an Italian masculine given name

See also 

 Agnoli
 D'Agnolo